Hahm Eun-jung (born December 12, 1988), known professionally as Eunjung and also Elsie, is a South Korean singer and actress. In 1995, she won Little Miss Korea competition at the age of seven and debuted as a child actress in the same year with the television drama A New Generation of Adults (1995). Since then, she has taken on several minor roles in movies, television series and also being cast in various commercial films. After three years of training, she debuted as a member of South Korean girl group T-ara in July 2009. She debuted as a solo artist by the name Elsie with her EP, I'm Good, on May 7, 2015.

Biography
Hahm was born in Seoul, South Korea. Her mother, a graduate of Ewha Womans University, is a former piano teacher who works as Hahm's agent. While attending seventh grade, Hahm started taekwondo lessons and won three different competitions. Her mother made the decision to quit teaching and manage her career upon her high school graduation in 2007. Later that year, Hahm enrolled in Dongguk University where she took performance courses. She is an only child and has been quoted as explaining, "My mother had me 10 years after she was married to my father, which seems more hurtful. Upon watching several famous performers in the past, she wanted to become an actress. Now that I have, she is very pleased I have acting as a priority. She believes her original prayers were answered."

Career

1995–2008: Career beginnings
In 1995, when Hahm was seven years old, she participated in the "Little Miss Korea" pageant and won. That same year, she appeared in the youth drama A New Generation of Adults, which aired on KBS. Afterwards, she had several minor roles in movies and Korean dramas, along with being cast in a handful of commercial films.

In 2007, Hahm appeared in various music videos, namely SG Wannabe's music video "Gasiri" ("") from their 2007 album Story In New York. Later that year, she would also be seen in FT Island's music videos "Thunder" (""), "Only One Person" (""), and "A Man's First Love Follow Him To The Grave" ("").

She also appeared in the 2008 horror film Death Bell, where she plays a student who was murdered by her teacher.

2009–2012: Rising popularity
Hahm originally trained to be an actress, and later debuted as a member of T-ara in July 2009. She was the first leader of the group, until September 2010.
Hahm featured in Davichi's music video "Time, Please Stop" ("") which was released on May 6, 2010.

Her first major acting role since joining T-ara was in SBS drama Coffee House, which aired on from May 17, 2010, to July 17, 2010. That same year, she was cast in the horror film White: The Melody of the Curse.

Hahm's popularity began to rise in 2011, when she starred in the teen drama Dream High. The drama was a success, and brought high domestic viewership ratings, and also gaining popularity in other countries and winning several international awards. From 2011 to 2012, she joined MBC's variety program We Got Married, pairing up with actor Lee Jang-woo. She won the Best Newcomer Award at the MBC Entertainment Awards. Hahm then starred in historical dramas The King of Legend and Insu, The Queen Mother.

In June 2012, Hahm was confirmed to star in the drama Five Fingers. However, on August 22, it was revealed that she had been dropped from the drama. The Korean Actors Labor Union demanded that Hahm be issued an apology by the producer and crew. In February 2013, Yein E&M issued a formal apology for firing Hahm without notice.

In October 2013, MBK Entertainment announced that Eun-jung participated in the arrangement of T-ara's upcoming track "I Know The Feeling" from their newest EP Again. Deoksang Park, the composer of the co-title song proposed to Eun-jung to collaborate on the arrangement.

2014–2017: Return to acting and solo debut
Hahm made her return to acting in 2014, with SBS' weekend drama Endless Love.

In 2015, it was announced that Hahm would play the lead role in the Thai romantic comedy Micro Love, making her the first female idol to star in a Thai movie. In May 2015, Hahm made her solo debut under the stage name ELSIE. She released her first mini album I'm Good, with the lead single of the same name featuring K.Will. The Chinese version of her music video peaked at #2 on the Chinese YinYueTai'''s music video charts. On October 14, Hahm released the song Goodbye, as the soundtrack of T-ara's web-drama Sweet Temptation. The song was also included in her repackaged mini album, Goodbye, released on October 30.

In 2016, Hahm was cast in Flowers of Evil, a thriller directed by Cho Sung-kyu. In 2017, Hahm was cast in MBC's daily drama, Sisters-in-Law, which premiered in April that year.

2018–present: New agency and solo career
In January 2018, Hahm confirmed her departure from MBK after her contract expired. In February 2018, Hahm signed an exclusive management contract with UFO Production, making her the company's first-ever artist. UFO Production, a subsidiary of technology company Pobis TNC, is more known for producing the MBC TV weekend drama Money Flower. On May 24, 2018, it was confirmed that Hahm was cast in the upcoming KBS's drama Lovely Horribly, starring Park Si-hoo and Song Ji-hyo.

On February 26, 2019, it was announced that Hahm would be the narrator for the Korea-Vietnam co-production documentary named The Muse Story, which will be broadcast on KBS World. On October 14, 2020, her label announced that Hahm will star in upcoming film called “I will sing” as a singer.

Hahm was cast in the leading role of the TV drama A Fool's Dream, which aired on KBS1 on every weekday from March 29, 2021, until October 1. On July 15, 2021, Hahm left Cabin 74 after her contract expired. On September 27, 2021, Hahm signed an exclusive contract with Management Koo.

On February 15, 2023, Hahm was confirmed to be part of the main cast of JTBC's variety program Differential Class for its new season which premiers on March 5. Differential Class is a popular informative and award-winning show which premiered in 2017 with a peak rating of 5%. It also has over 500K followers and over 200M Views on YouTube.

 Advertisements 

 Endorsements and promotions 
Eunjung has modeled for several brands since before her debut as a singer. Her first ever advertisement was a print-in ad for Korea's No.1 mineral water Jeju Samdasoo in 1998.

In February 2011, Eunjung, along with actor Kim Soo-hyun, was chosen as an exclusive model for clothing brand SPRIS. The brand is known to be the most preferred brand among young people with previous models including Lee Joon-gi, Kim Beom and 2PM. The brand was promoted with a series of TV commercial films including a 3-minute music-drama video which featured a newly recorded song by both Eunjung and Kim Soo-hyung called "Crazy4s", though the song was never officially released.

In 2015, posters featuring Eunjung as a model for Burger King were released all over Korea, Hahm became the third T-ara member to endorse the restaurant after Hyomin and Jiyeon in 2014.

In 2016, Eunjung was selected as a model for Coca Cola'' along with Yubin, Park Yoon and Jo Se-hyeon. She attended several promotional events for the brand for 2 years since 2015 including its 130th anniversary exhibition event.

Ambassadorships

Discography

Filmography

Concerts

Awards and nominations

Other recognitions

Listicles

Notes

References

External links

1988 births
T-ara members
Actresses from Seoul
Singers from Seoul
South Korean child actresses
South Korean female dancers
South Korean women pop singers
South Korean female taekwondo practitioners
Dongguk University alumni
K-pop singers
South Korean film actresses
South Korean dance music singers
South Korean Christians
South Korean female idols
South Korean television actresses
South Korean television personalities
Living people
MBK Entertainment artists
21st-century South Korean actresses
21st-century South Korean women singers